Pawsonia saxicola, the sea gherkin, is a species of sea cucumber in the family Cucumariidae. It is found in the northeastern Atlantic Ocean and the Mediterranean Sea.

Description
The cuticle of the body is smooth with five longitudinal rows of tube feet. The ventral rows are double and clearly visible, while the dorsal rows are largely replaced by low button-shaped protuberances, except near the mouth. The cuticle contains calcareous spicules which are star-shaped. This  sea cucumber may be confused with Aslia lefevrei. Both live in crevices with their dark-coloured tentacles projecting; P. saxicola is white, but may darken somewhat when exposed to light, while Aslia lefevrei is brown.

Distribution and habitat
This sea cucumber is native to the northeastern Atlantic Ocean and the Mediterranean Sea. Its range extends from the west and south coast of the British Isles to the coasts of France, Spain and Portugal and to the Azores.

Ecology
Pawsonia saxicola is a suspension feeder, consuming diatoms and single-cell algae and also zooplankton, such as copepods, ostracods, protozoans, nematodes, jellyfish and larvae, as well as drifting organic particles. The food is gathered by the feeding tentacles which each in turn shrinks and bends and is inserted into the mouth; the two ventral tentacles are short and forked, and are used at the mouth to push particles inside. Although in some related species the short tentacles co-ordinate their activities with the longer tentacles, this is not the case in P. saxicola where they seem to act independently.

References

Cucumariidae
Fauna of the Atlantic Ocean
Fauna of the Mediterranean Sea
Animals described in 1871